Arthur Budgett (26 May 1916 – 21 June 2011) was a British Thoroughbred racehorse trainer who was one of only two people to have bred, owned and trained two English Derby winners.

Based at Whatcombe Estate in Berkshire, Budgett was British flat racing champion trainer in 1969.

Budgett purchased the mare Windmill Girl in 1962. Two of her foals were named after neighbouring villages in Norfolk, Blakeney and Morston, as was Blakeney's sire Hethersett. Blakeney went on to win the 1969 Derby and Morston followed up by winning the 1973 Derby.

Budgett retired in 1975.

References

Book citations

British racehorse trainers
British racehorse owners and breeders
People educated at Eton College
Alumni of Christ Church, Oxford
Owners of Epsom Derby winners
2011 deaths
1916 births
British Indian Army soldiers
Indian Army personnel of World War II